Union Party may refer to:

Union Party (Armenia)
Union Party (Burma), a defunct political party in Myanmar
Union Party (Egypt), an Egyptian political party
Union Party (Faroe Islands), a political party of the Faroe Islands
 The Union Parties, the CDU/CSU political party alliance in Germany
Union Party (Iceland), a historical political party of Iceland
Syriac Union Party (Lebanon)
Union Party (Lebanon)
Union Party (Ukraine), a political party of Ukraine
Papua and Niugini Union Pati, a political party of Papua New Guinea
Union of Puerto Rico, a historical political party of Puerto Rico
Union Party (United States), a historical political party from the American Great Depression.
National Union Party (United States), the name of the ticket on which Abraham Lincoln and Andrew Johnson ran in the 1864 United States presidential election.

See also 
 Unionist Party (disambiguation)
 Federal Union (disambiguation)
 Unionist (disambiguation)
 Unionism (disambiguation)